The Sichuan Television Festival, abbreviated SCTVF, also known as the Sichuang International Television Festival is one of the largest television festivals in East Asia. The Sichuan TV Festival develops from Sichuan International TV Week, which was held in Chengdu in February 1990. Held since 1991, STVF has become one of the most prestigious international television festivals in Asia.

The festival is also home to the bi-annual Gold Panda Awards, the awards features the categories of miniseries, made-for-TV movies and TV series.

Awards Categories

Television Series

Mini-series or Television Film

Animation

See also

List of Asian television awards

References

External links
Official Site
Official Weibo

Recurring events established in 1991
Chinese television awards
1991 establishments in China